Oppressor was a technical death metal band from Chicago, Illinois, which formed in 1991 and disbanded in 1999. They released three albums. Three of the band's members went on to form alternative metal band Soil.

History
Oppressor was started in May 1991 by Tim King and Adam Zadel. A month later, they found another guitarist, Jim Stopper, and a drummer, Tom Schofield. They recorded their first demo, World Abomination, in 1991. A second demo, As Blood Flows, recorded in 1992, got them a record deal with Red Light Records, who released their first full-length album, Solstice of Oppression, in 1994. Shortly after the album's release, Red Light went bankrupt and the band was forced to find another label. In the meantime, the band released a one-off live album/compilation album with Megalithic Records, entitled Oppression Live/As Blood Flows. Megalithic, a Milwaukee, WI label, also went bankrupt after a few months of activity. They managed to score a record deal with Olympic Recordings and released Agony in 1996. In 1997, three-quarters of the band, bar Jim Stopper, started an alternative metal side project called Soil, with Broken Hope guitarist Shaun Glass and Ryan McCombs. In 1998, Oppressor released their final album, Elements of Corrosion. When in 1999 Soil become more popular than Oppressor, the band decided to part ways. In 2021, vocalist Tim King announced his return to death metal with a new band called Embryonic Autopsy. The Embryonic Autopsy debut album Prophecies of the Conjoined was released by Massacre Records in February 2022.

Musical style
Oppressor played death metal in a style that came to be known as technical death metal. They were influenced by bands like Morbid Angel, Death, Gorguts, and Suffocation. Their lyrical themes usually centred on conventional themes such as death, suffering, and moral depravity. They were also one of the first death metal bands to incorporate keyboards into their music.

Members

Former
 Tim King - lead vocals, bass, keyboards (1991-1999)
 Adam Zadel - guitar (1991-1999)
 Jim Stopper - guitar (1991-1999)
 Tom Schofield - drums (1991-1999)

Discography

Demos
 World Abomination (1991)
 As Blood Flows (1992)

EPs
 Oppressor (1994, Funeral Mask)

Studio albums
 Solstice of Oppression (1994, Red Light)
 Agony (1996, Olympic)
 Elements of Corrosion (1998, Olympic)

Compilation albums
 Oppression Live/As Blood Flows (1995, Megalithic)
 The Solstice of Agony and Corrosion (2009, Mortal Music)

External links
 Oppressor at Encyclopedia Metallum
 [ Oppressor at AllMusic]

American technical death metal musical groups
Musical groups established in 1991
Musical groups disestablished in 1999
Musical groups from Chicago
Musical quartets
1991 establishments in Illinois